The Peaches is a 1964 British short film, narrated by Peter Ustinov.

In 1964 the film was the British choice for the Cannes Film Festival and is a sensual, surreal fantasy about a beautiful woman and her passion for peaches. The 15-minute story, which opens with a woman splayed on a bed rubbing her face with a ripe peach.

Directed by Michael Gill and written by Yvonne Gilan, his then wife, it stars Juliet Harmer as the Very Beautiful Girl, Tom Adams as The Boy Next Door, and is narrated by Peter Ustinov.  It also features an appearance from the nine-year-old A. A. Gill, son of the director and writer.

The film charts the coming of age of this clever and beautiful girl and her fetish for fruit. In search of kindred spirits of like intellect, she goes to live in the city, but finds herself cleaning in "the Ministry". She then falls in love, and the peaches become less important as her love grows. Bizarrely she transfers her craving to pickled onions.

The film won several awards and made Michael Gill consider working in Hollywood. Instead he chose to remain at the BBC, where he later approached Sir Kenneth Clark to make the television series Civilisation.

The film was funded by the BFI’s Experimental Film Fund, established by Sir Michael Balcon.

Cast

Juliet Harmer as The Very Beautiful Girl
Tom Adams as The Boy Next Door

References

External links

1964 films
British short films
1964 short films